The 2021 Euro Beach Soccer League was the 24th season of the Euro Beach Soccer League (EBSL), the annual, premier competition in European beach soccer contested between men's national teams. It was organised by Beach Soccer Worldwide (BSWW), in a league and play-off format.

After only Division A went ahead last season due to the COVID-19 pandemic, for the 2021 season, the competing teams returned to taking part in two divisions: the top tier (Division A) and the bottom tier (Division B). 12 teams contested Division A; all twelve teams returned from the 2019 season after only five participated in 2020 due to travel constraints caused by the COVID-19 pandemic. Division B also accommodated 12 nations: those who did not gain promotion in 2019, Slovakia making their debut, and teams that returned after an absence from competing in recent years prior to 2020.

Due to continued effects of the COVID-19 pandemic in Europe, the season's format was altered considerably compared to the usual program. A total of just two stages of fixtures were scheduled during the regular season. All 12 teams from Division A played together in just one stage (compared to the usual two) whilst each team in Division B also played together in one stage.

The eight best teams in Division A advanced to the post-season event, the Superfinal, to compete to become the winners of the EBSL. Meanwhile, the top seven teams in Division B and the team ranked bottom of Division A played in a different post-season event, the Promotion Final, to try to earn a spot in Division A in 2022.

Estonia were promoted to Division A for the first time after beating Turkey to claim the Promotion Final title; the Turks, having finished last in Division A, failed to defend their place in the Promotion Final and were therefore relegated to Division B, ending their four-year run in the top tier. Portugal were the two-time defending champions and successfully defended the title, extending their record total to eight European crowns; by winning a third consecutive title, Portugal matched the feat only previously achieved by Spain between 1999 and 2001. Belarus reached their first final, and became the first new nation to finish in the top four since Romania in 2011. Despite winning the 2021 World Cup just a fortnight prior, Russia failed to finish in the top four for the first time since 2006.

Calendar and locations 
The calendar below was revealed on 13 April 2021.

Teams

The following teams entered the season, divided into two divisions, A and B, as shown (12 in Division A, 12 in Division B).

The numbers in parentheses show the European ranking of each team prior to the start of the season, out of 34 nations.

Division A
In 2020, teams from Division A who decided not to compete because of any concerns surrounding the COVID-19 pandemic were not penalised. This season, BSWW declared teams would be penalised for not competing unless they could provide evidence of a legitimate reason in respect of the continued effects of the pandemic. Ultimately, all teams did participate.

  (1st)
  (2nd)
  (3rd)
  (4th)
  (5th)
  (6th)

  (7th)
  (8th)
  (9th)
  (10th)
  (11th)
  (12th)

Division B
England did not compete for the first time since their debut in 2001, ending 19 consecutive years of participation; Sweden returned for the first time since 2004.

  (13th)
  (14th)
  (17th)
  (18th)
  (19th)
  (20th)

  (21st)
  (22nd)
  (24th)
  (25th)
 1 (31st)
  (n/a)

Notes:
1. Teams making their debut

Stage 1 (Nazaré, 17–19 June)
Matches are listed as local time in Nazaré, WEST (UTC+1)

All matches took place at the Estádio do Viveiro – Jordan Santos on Praia de Nazaré (Nazaré Beach). Due to COVID-19 concerns, the matches were played behind closed doors.

All teams from Division A competed; there were no Division B fixtures during this stage. It took place in tandem with the first group stage of the World Cup qualifiers for UEFA; the teams of Division A joined its second group stage immediately after the conclusion of this event. BSWW decided to organise the two events back-to-back in the same location involving all nations, in order to minimise travel in consideration of the continued effects of the COVID-19 pandemic.

The best eight teams qualified for the Superfinal; the worst team was consigned to the Promotion Final.

Group 1

Group 2

Group 3

Awards
The following were presented after the conclusion of the final day's matches.

Stage 2 (Chișinău, 28 July – 1 August)
Matches are listed as local time in Chișinău, EEST (UTC+3)

All matches took place at the FMF Beach Soccer Arena in La Izvor Park; the stadium had a capacity of 1,024, however was limited to 50% in order to accommodate social distancing measures regarding the COVID-19 pandemic.

There were no Division A fixtures during this stage, making this the first stage exclusive to Division B teams since 2007. Slovakia made their EBSL debut during this stage; Moldova hosted for the first time.

Group stage

Group A

Group B

Kazakhstan & Lithuania; Greece & Sweden are ranked based on their head-to-head results.

Group C

Final group stage ranking
Since Group A consisted of three teams, for the teams in first, second and third place in Groups B and C, their results against the teams finishing in fourth place in their groups were discounted for this ranking.

Ranking & tie-breaking criteria: 1. Group placement 2. Points earned 3. Goal difference 4. Goals for

Semi-finals

Finals

Final standings

Awards
The following were presented after the conclusion of the final day's matches.

Promotion Final (Figueira da Foz, 9–12 September)
The top seven teams from Division B and the team bottom of Division A played in the Promotion Final; the winner earned a place in Division A next season.

Qualified teams
The team in  attempted to retain their position in Division A, having finished as the worst team of Division A's regular season event.

Slovakia originally qualified, but withdrew "at the last minute" for undisclosed reasons; Sweden replaced them as lucky losers.

1 1
1
 (Last place, Division A)

Notes:
1. First appearance in Promotion Final

Group stage

Group 1

Turkey & Greece; Kazakhstan & Lithuania are ranked based on their head-to-head results

Group 2

Play-off stage

Seventh place play-off

Fifth place play-off

Third place play-off

Promotion play-off final

Final standings
By winning the event, Estonia earned promotion to Division A for the first time, having previously lost the final twice in 2015 and 2017. In losing the final, Turkey failed to defend their Division A status and were relegated to Division B for 2022, ending a four-year stay in the top tier.

Superfinal (Figueira da Foz, 9–12 September)
Matches are listed as local time in Figueira da Foz, WEST (UTC+1).

The winners of the Superfinal were crowned 2021 EBSL champions.

Qualified teams
The top eight teams from Division A's regular season event qualified for the Superfinal:

 
 (hosts)

Group stage

Group 1

Group 2

Play-off stage

Seventh place play-off

Fifth place play-off

Third place play-off

Superfinal match

Awards

Winners trophy

Individual awards
Awarded for feats achieved in the Superfinal only

Final standings

Top scorers
The following tables list the top 12 scorers in Division A and in Division B, including goals scored in both the regular and post season events.

Note there are no awards presented for these season-encompassing scoring feats, the tables are for statistical purposes only. Scoring awards were bestowed per stage, with the primary award that which was presented in the Superfinal. Goals scored by Turkish players in the Promotion Final are not counted towards either table.

Division A

Sources: Stage 1, Superfinal

Division B

Sources: Stage 2 (note that Kazakh scorers are missing from this source), Promotion Final

See also
2021 Women's Euro Beach Soccer League

References

External links
 Beach Soccer Worldwide (BSWW), official website
 Stage 1, Nazaré
 Stage 2, Chișinău
 Promotion Final, Figueira da Foz
 Superfinal, Figueira da Foz
Euroleague 2021, at BS Russia (in Russian)

Euro Beach Soccer League
Euro Beach Soccer League
Euro Beach Soccer League
Euro Beach Soccer League
Euro Beach Soccer League
Euro Beach Soccer League
Euro Beach Soccer League
Euro Beach Soccer League